The 2022 AFC Champions League is the 41st edition of Asia's premier club football tournament organized by the Asian Football Confederation (AFC), and the 20th under the current AFC Champions League title.

This season is officially the last season in an all-year-round (spring-to-autumn) schedule despite actually being held from 2022 to 2023; from next season onwards the competitions will switch to an autumn-to-spring schedule.

The winners of the tournament will automatically qualify for the 2023–24 AFC Champions League, entering the qualifying play-offs, if they have not qualified through their domestic performance. This edition sees increase in numbers of preliminary players registration with 35 players can be registered, up from 30 in previous editions. This will pave the way for more foreign players to be included in squad although the AFC "3+1" foreign players rule will be in effect during the match. The winner of the final will earn the right to play in the 2023 FIFA Club World Cup in Saudi Arabia. 

Al-Hilal of Saudi Arabia are the defending champions, having defeated Pohang Steelers in the 2021 final. 2021 AFC Cup winners Al-Muharraq, having not obtained an AFC license, were not eligible to participate in this edition.

Association team allocation
The 47 AFC member associations are ranked based on their clubs' performance over the last four years in AFC competitions (their national team's FIFA World Rankings no longer considered). The slots are allocated by the following criteria according to the Entry Manual:
The associations are split into two regions (Article 3.1):
West Region consists of the 25 associations from the West Asian Football Federation (WAFF), the South Asian Football Federation (SAFF), and the Central Asian Football Association (CAFA).
East Region consists of the 22 associations from the ASEAN Football Federation (AFF) and the East Asian Football Federation (EAFF).
The AFC may reallocate one or more associations to another region if necessary for sporting reasons.
The top 12 associations in each region are eligible to enter the AFC Champions League.
In each region, there are five groups in the group stage, including 16 direct slots, with the 4 remaining slots filled through qualifying play-offs (Article 3.2). The slots in each region are distributed as follows:
The associations ranked 1st and 2nd are each allocated three direct slots and one play-off slot.
The associations ranked 3rd and 4th are each allocated two direct slots and two play-off slots.
The associations ranked 5th are each allocated one direct slot and two play-off slots.
The associations ranked 6th are each allocated one direct slot and one play-off slot.
The associations ranked 7th to 10th are each allocated one direct slot.
The associations ranked 11th and 12th are each allocated one play-off slot.
The AFC Champions League title holders and AFC Cup title holders are each allocated one play-off slot should they not qualify for the tournament through domestic performance (Article 3.6). The following rules are applied:
If the AFC Champions League title holders or AFC Cup title holders are from associations ranked 1st to 6th, their association is allocated the same number of play-off slots, and they replace the lowest-seeded team from their association. Otherwise, their association is allocated one additional play-off slot, and they do not replace any team from their association (Articles 3.8, 3.9 and 3.10).
If both the AFC Champions League title holders and AFC Cup title holders are from the same association which is allocated only one play-off slot, their association is allocated one additional play-off slot, and only the lowest-seeded team from their association is replaced as a result (Article 3.11).
The AFC Champions League title holders and AFC Cup title holders are the lowest-seeded teams in the qualifying play-offs if they do not replace any team from their association (Article 3.12).
If any association ranked 1st to 6th do not fulfill any one of the AFC Champions League criteria, they have all their direct slots converted into play-off slots. The direct slots given up are redistributed to the highest eligible association by the following criteria (Articles 3.13 and 3.14):
For each association, the maximum number of total slots is four and the maximum number of direct slots is three (Articles 3.4 and 3.5).
If any association ranked 3rd to 6th is allocated one additional direct slot, one play-off slot is annulled and not redistributed.
If any association ranked 5th to 6th is allocated two additional direct slots, one play-off slot is annulled and not redistributed.
If any association ranked 7th to 10th do not fulfill any one of the AFC Champions League criteria, they have their direct slot converted into play-off slot. The direct slot given up is redistributed to the next association ranked 11th or 12th, whose play-off slot is annulled and not redistributed, or if neither are eligible, the highest eligible association by the same criteria as mentioned above (Articles 3.16 and 3.17).
If any association with only play-off slot(s), including any association ranked 11th to 12th or those mentioned above, do not fulfill the minimum AFC Champions League criteria, the play-off slot(s) are annulled and not redistributed (Articles 3.19 and 3.20).
For each association, the maximum number of total slots is one-third of the total number of eligible teams (excluding foreign teams) in the top division (Article 3.4). If this rule is applied, any direct slots given up are redistributed by the same criteria as mentioned above, and play-off slots are annulled and not redistributed (Article 9.10).
All participating teams must be granted an AFC Champions League license, and apart from cup winners, finish in the top half of their top division (Articles 7.1 and 9.5). If any association do not have enough teams which satisfy this criteria, any direct slots given up are redistributed by the same criteria as mentioned above, and play-off slots are annulled and not redistributed (Article 9.9).
If any team granted a license refuses to participate, their slot, either direct or play-off, is annulled and not redistributed (Article 9.11).

Association ranking
For the 2022 AFC Champions League, the associations are allocated slots according to their AFC Club Competitions Ranking which was published on 29 November 2019, which takes into account their performance in the AFC Champions League and the AFC Cup during the period between 2016 and 2019.

Notes

Teams
In the following table, the number of appearances and last appearance count only those since the 2002–03 season (including qualifying rounds), when the competition was rebranded as the AFC Champions League.

Notes

Schedule
The schedule of the competition is as follows. The final version was originally announced on 13 January 2022, with the following modifications made on 9 December 2022: the West Region knockout stage matches were pushed back by two weeks in February, while the final was moved from 19 and 26 February to 29 April and 6 May 2023.

Original schedule
The original schedule of the competition, as planned in 2019 before the pandemic, included a two-legged knockout stage.

In June 2021, a minor revision was made to the schedule of the preliminary and play-off stages: matches were moved one week earlier in January.

First major revision to schedule
On 5 July 2021, the AFC announced the first revised schedule of the competition, featuring a centralised group stage and single-leg knockout stage matches.

Second major revision to schedule
On 13 January 2022, the AFC announced the second revised schedule of the competition, with the knockout stage of the West Region pushed back to February 2023, and a two-legged format restored for the final.

Qualifying play-offs

Preliminary round

Play-off round

Group stage

Group A

Group B

Group C

Group D

Group E

Group F

Group G

Group H

Group I

Group J

Ranking of second-placed teams

West Region

East Region

Knockout stage

Bracket

Round of 16

Quarter-finals

Semi-finals

Final

Top scorers

See also
2022 AFC Cup

Notes

References

External links

1
1
 
2022
Current association football seasons